Prethopalpus blosfeldsorum is a litter-dwelling goblin spider in the family Oonopidae.

Distribution 
This species is endemic to the Kroombit Tops region in Queensland.

Description 
The male is 1.05 mm, but females are unknown.

Etymology 
This species is named in honour of Bruno and Denise Blosfelds.

References 

Oonopidae
Spiders of Australia
Spiders described in 2012